The Planetary Collegium (a.k.a. CAiiA / Centre for Advanced Inquiry in Integrative Arts) is an international transcultural and transdisciplinary new media art educational research platform that promotes on the doctorate level the integration of art, science, technology, and consciousness research under the rubric of the technoetic arts. It is based in the School of Art, Design and Architecture department at Plymouth University in the United Kingdom with nodes in Trento, Lucerne and Shanghai. Since its inception in 1994, over 80 doctoral candidates have graduated from the Planetary Collegium with Plymouth University PhDs. The founding President is Professor Roy Ascott.

History 
The Planetary Collegium was  conceived and established by Roy Ascott as the Centre for Advanced Inquiry in the Interactive Arts (CAiiA)  in 1994 at what is now the University of Wales, Newport

Three years later, Ascott established STAR (Science Technology and Art Research) in the School of Computing, University of Plymouth. CAiiA-STAR constituted a joint research platform, with access to supervisory and technical resources of both universities.

In 2003, Ascott contracted to relocate the platform to Plymouth University, renaming it the Planetary Collegium, where it is currently located in the Faculty of Arts and Humanities.

Since 1997, the Collegium has given more than seventy conferences and symposia in Europe, North and South America, Japan, China and Australia.

Since its inception, first at the University of Wales and currently at Plymouth, over 80 doctoral candidates have graduated.

Aims
The Collegium aims to produce new knowledge in the context of the arts, through transdisciplinary inquiry and critical discourse, with special reference to technoetic research and to advances in science and technology. Its seeks to reflect the social, technological and spiritual aspirations of an emerging planetary society, while sustaining a critical awareness of the retrograde forces and fields that inhibit social and cultural development. It combines the face-to-face association of individuals with the trans-cultural unity of telematic communities, thereby developing a network of research nodes strategically located across the planet, each with a distinctive cultural ethos. The Collegium seeks outcomes that involve new language, systems, structures, and behaviours, and insights into the nature of mind, matter and human identity.

Structure 
As conceived and directed by Ascott, the Planetary Collegium consists of artists, theoreticians and scholars working within the context of transdisciplinarity and syncretism so as to develop their research in the practice and theory of new media art with a special interest in telematics and technoetics. Currently, their doctoral research leads to the award of the University of Plymouth PhD. Post-doctoral research is also pursued. It has attracted an impressive number of internationally well-established artists, musicians, performers, designers, architects, theorists and scholars involved in doctoral and post-doctoral research.

Currently, the hub of the Collegium, CAiiA-Hub (the Centre for Advanced Inquiry in Integrative Arts) is situated in the School of Art and Media, Faculty of Arts, Plymouth University. The Collegium has a Node De Tao-Node  in Shanghai. The programme, which is largely part-time, has a virtually 100% success rate, with well over 80 doctoral graduates .

In addition to doctoral candidates and graduates, supervisors and honorary members, its constituency also includes general members, who share the aims and interests of the Collegium, and are invited to participate in its development on FaceBook.

The Planetary Collegium has a geographically dispersed membership and convenes the majority of its research sessions and public conferences in Asia, Australia, the Americas and Europe.

Node Directors 
DeTao-Node Shanghai, China. DeTao Masters Academy in Shanghai. Director: Roy Ascott
T-Node Trento, Italy. Fondazione Ahref. Director: Francesco Monico
NGL-Node Lucerne, Switzerland. NGL - SAA Neue Galerie Luzern - Swiss Academic Association. Director: René Stettler

Awards 
The Collegium was awarded The World Universities Forum Award for Best Practice in Higher Education 2011.

Collegium President 
Roy Ascott, Founding President, 
2014 Recipient of the Prix Ars Electronica Golden Nica Award for Visionary Pioneer of New Media Art. Doctor Honoris Causa, Ionian University, Corfu, Greece. Honorary Professor, Aalborg University, Denmark. Honorary Professor, West London University, UK. Professor, Shanghai Institute of Visual Arts. DeTao Master of Technoetic Arts, DeTao Masters Academy, Shanghai, China.

Collegium Advisory Board 
Honorary Fellows of the Collegium
Marco Bischof
James Gimzewski
Pierre Lévy
Luis Eduardo Luna
Roger Malina
Ryohei Nakatsu
Louise Poissant
Thomas S. Ray
 Marilyn Schlitz
Barbara Maria Stafford
Academic Members of the Collegium Advisory Board
Mike Phillips, Principal Supervisor, CAiiA-Node
Jane Grant, Principal Supervisor, CAiiA-Node
 Jing (Luna) Zhou, Associate Director, DeTao Node

Advanced Research Associates
The Advanced Research Associateship (ARA) involves post-doctoral or advanced practice research. ARAs are required to attend three Composite Sessions within their year of registration, and to participate in the associated international research conferences.
 CAiiA-Hub:
 Heather Raikes, University of Washington, Seattle, US (2011–12).
 Paulo Rodrigues, University of Aveiro, Portugal (2010–11).
 Wengao Huang, University of Plymouth, UK (2005–06).
 Cristina Miranda de Almeida, University of the Basque Country. (2005–06).
 Andrea Gaugusch, University of Vienna, Austria (2003–04).
 Dene Grigar, Washington State University—Vancouver (2002–04).
 Katia Maciel, Federal University Rio de Janeiro, Brazil (2001–02).
 Tania Fraga, University of Brasilia, Brazil (1999–2000).
 M-Node:
 Luisa Paraguai, Anhembi Morumbi University, São Paulo, Brazil  (2011–12).
 Gianna Angelini, University of Macerata, Macerata, Italy (2012-) 
 I-Node, Lila Moore,(2014-2015).

The Consciousness Reframed Conferences 
Instituted by Roy Ascott, the international research conference series Consciousness Reframed: art and consciousness in the post-biological era
brings together each year between 60 and 100 presenters from up to 25 countries
1997, 1998, and 2000. University of Wales College, Newport
1998. University of Plymouth, England. Conference workshop The Architecture of Consciousness
2002. Perth, Western Australia. Hosted by Curtin University
2003. University of Wales College, Newport.
2004. Beijing, China. Qi and Complexity  Digital Media Studio, Central Academy of Fine Arts; China Electronic Music Center, Central Conservatory of Music; Department of Digital Art and Design, School of Software, Peking University; Institute of Digital Media, Beijing Normal University.
2005. University of Plymouth, England. Altered States: Transformations of Perception, Place & Performance.
2006. University of Plymouth, England. Altered States: Immatereality.
2008. Vienna, Austria. New Realities : Being Syncretic Hosted by Universität für Angewandte Kunst Wien.
2009. Munich, Germany. Macromedia Hochschule für Medien und Kommunikation.  Experiencing Design, Behaving Media .
2010. Trondheim, Norway. TEKS - Trondheim Electronic Arts Center. Making Reality Really Real .
2011. Shanghai, China. Institute of Visual Art, Fudan University. Transcultural Tendencies | Transmedial Transactions.
2011. Centro Cultural Belem and Artshare. Lisbon, Portugal. Presence in the Mindfield: Art, Identity and the Technology of Transformation .
2012. Ionion Center for the Arts and Culture. Kefalonia, Greece. Technoetic Telos: Art, Myth and Media
2013. The German University in Cairo, Egypt. 2013. "Behind the Image and Beyond"
2015 De Tao Masters Academy, Shanghai, China. "The Matter of the Immaterial".
2016 De Tao Masters Academy, Shanghai, China."Presumptive Predications: art and the future".
2017 Central Academy of Fine Arts, Beijing, China."Subtle Cybernetics and the Art of Mind".
2019 Universidade Catolica Portuguesa, Porto, Portugal."Sentient States: Bio-mind and Techno-nature".

Research Sessions and Public Conferences 
Sessions and conferences have been hosted by:
Artspace Media Centre, Dublin (1997)
 La Beneficia Cultural Centre, Valencia (1998)
CYPRES, Marseilles (1999)
 Federal University, Rio de Janeiro (1999)
University of Arizona, Tucson (2000)
École Nationale Supérieure des Beaux-Arts, Paris (2000)
Fondazione Fitzcaraldo, Turin (2001)
Universitat Oberta de Catalunya, Barcelona (2001)
University of California DARNet, Santa Cruz and Los Angeles (2001)
University of Arizona, Tucson (2002)
Curtin University, Perth, Western Australia (2002)
 IAMAS, Ogaki, Japan (2002)
The Hochschule fuer Gestaltung und Kunst, Zurich (2003)
Image Technology Center, Universidade Federal do Rio de Janeiro, Paraciutu and Fortaleza (2003)
Ciberart, Bilbao (2004)
School of Software, Peking University, Beijing (2004)
Texas Woman's University, Dallas (2005)
University of Plymouth, Plymouth (2005)
Sabancı University, Istanbul (2005)
University of Arizona, Tucson (2006)
University of Plymouth,  (2006)
SESC , São Paulo, Brazil (2006)
Hexagram , Montreal (2007)
University of Plymouth,  (2007)
Nuova Accademia di Belle Arti Milano - NABA (2007)
LABoral Centro de Arte y Creación Industrial, Gijon, Asturias, Spain (2008)
Universität für Angewandte Kunst Wien (2007)  Vienna, Austria (2008)
SESC , São Paulo, Brazil (2008)
La Sala Parpallo  Valencia, Spain (2009)
macromedia hochschule für medien und kommunikation Munich, Germany (2009)
Artshare, Porto, Portugal, 2010
Ionion Centre for the Arts and Culture, Kefalonia, Greece, 2011
CIANT - International Centre for Art and New Technologies, Prague, Czech Republic. 2012
XARTS - International Conference on Extended Arts - From Virtual to Real, Syros, Greece. 2013
Witwatersrand University, Johannesburg."Fak'ugesi Digital Africa Conference".214.
2016 American University in Cairo, Egypt. "Cairotronica".

External links
The Planetary Collegium at University of Plymouth, England

Footnotes

Transdisciplinarity
New media art
International artist groups and collectives
University of Plymouth